The Best... Album in the World...Ever! is a compilation album brand from Circa Records (trading under the 'strategic marketing' brand name of EMI Records/Virgin Records). Usually the album's title is made of the main title, genre and maybe issue number (so albums would include The Best Ibiza Album in the World...Ever!, The Best Rock Album in the World...Ever! etc.), however on a number of indie music collections the genre aspect was replaced by a full list of artist names. Due to this, these were just normally listed as The Best Album in the World...Ever!, and featured many Britpop acts, as well as dance acts such as Chemical Brothers.

Although most albums use the Album in the World...Ever! suffix, some towards the late 1990s change the suffix to Anthems...Ever!, with a plural on the theme (example the album The Best Celtic Anthems...Ever!). Some even just use ...Ever! as a suffix (such as The Best TV Ads...Ever!)

Many of the albums in the series were compiled by Ashley Abram.

History
The series started with The Best...Dance Album in the World...Ever! (1993) which was a success. The Dance strand lead to a fourteen volume subseries. Other more successful subseries were Air Guitar, Sixties, Club Anthems and the aforementioned alternative rock Best...Album in the World Evers.

The Best Club Anthems...Ever!, featuring house, big beat, techno and electronica was released in 1997, and there have been 16 sequels. One difference from The Best Dance Album in the World..Ever! and The Best Club Anthems...Ever series is that Club Anthems originally had its tracks mixed, although this stopped beginning with 2003's Very Best Club Anthems release.

The Best Air Guitar Album in the World...Ever!, referred to in retrospect as Air Guitar I, released 5 November 2001, was compiled by Brian May. A sequel was released in November 2002 and another in November 2003, the latter proclaiming itself to be the last Air Guitar Album in the World...Ever!. Both sequels were again compiled by Brian May. In 2005, a 3CD The Best of the Best Air Guitar Album in the World...Ever! was released. Whilst Air Guitar III proclaimed to be the final volume, the liner notes written by May in The Best of the Best start with "OK, we lied."

Sometimes, the albums have captured a moment of popularity for things other than music, such as The Best TV Ads...Ever!, a compilation released in May 2000 of songs from current and famous TV adverts which was released just days after the "100 Greatest TV Ads" poll from Channel 4 and The Sunday Times aired on the former. Furthermore, many other albums with a similar concept followed from other labels, including Switched On from rival label Telstar, Classic Ads from Universal, Commercial Breaks from Beechwood Music and the similarly titled Commercial Break from Castle Music.

The series was immensely popular, and all of the volumes performed well in the album charts. The series started to become subject to popular culture parodies, as spoof band Shirehorses titled their first album from 1997 The worst...album in the world...ever...EVER!. Blur, who appeared on some of the albums in the series, were originally going to title their 2000 compilation Blur: The Best of as Best Blur Album in the World Ever.

The series originally featured a globe on each album cover, to represent the world, as referred to in the album titles. When the Anthems...Ever! and the simply ...Ever! titles started to appear in 1997, the globe didn't usually appear on the cover. The globe continued to be featured on in the World...Ever! covers nonetheless, although in 2001–02, it started to become absent from the album covers of in the World...Ever! albums too, as it is absent from the Air Guitar covers and one of the Dance covers.

List of compilations

The Best... Album in the World... Ever!

These albums have the genre of indie/alternative music.

These albums finished in 1998, although the series was picked up again in 2001 under a new name, The Album:.

The brand new The Album: series spawned six more volumes (although a hiatus was present in two of its five active years)

Volume 1 (1995)
VTDCD 58

Disc 1
Supergrass – "Alright"
Blur – "Girls and Boys"
Elastica – "Waking Up"
Ash – "Girl From Mars"
Oasis – "Whatever"
Edwyn Collins – "A Girl Like You"
The Charlatans – "The Only One I Know"
Pulp – "Do You Remember the First Time?"
McAlmont & Butler – "Yes"
Morrissey – "Everyday Is Like Sunday"
Radiohead – "High and Dry"
The Cranberries – "Zombie"
The Smashing Pumpkins – "Today"
Manic Street Preachers – "La Tristesse Durera (Scream to a Sigh)"
James – "Sit Down"
The Boo Radleys – "Wake Up Boo!"
Suede – "Animal Nitrate"
The Verve – "This is Music"
Inspiral Carpets – "I Want You"
Therapy? – "Screamager"

Disc 2
The Smiths – "This Charming Man"
The Jesus & Mary Chain – "April Skies"
Oasis – "Supersonic"
The Stone Roses – "Fools Gold" (Original version)
Stereo MC's – "Connected"
The Prodigy – "Out of Space"
The Shamen – "Destination Eschaton" (Beatmasters 7" remix)
New Order – "True Faith '94"
The Chemical Brothers – "Leave Home"
Fluke – "Bullet"
Primal Scream – "Loaded"
EMF – "Unbelievable"
Jesus Jones – "Real, Real, Real"
Depeche Mode – "Personal Jesus" (7" version)
Blur – "Chemical World"
The Levellers – "15 Years"
The Auteurs – "Lenny Valentino"
Skunk Anansie – "I Can Dream"
Dreadzone – "Captain Dread"
The Future Sound of London – "Lifeforms (Path 4) (radio edit)"

There are 28 credited artists in the full title of the album.

Volume 2 (1996)
VTDCD 76

Disc 1
Oasis – "Wonderwall"
Paul Weller – "Wild Wood"
Radiohead – "Creep"
Cast – "Fine Time"
Pulp – "Common People"
The Lightning Seeds – "The Life of Riley"
Blur – "Parklife"
Saint Etienne – "He's on the Phone"
Sleeper – "What Do I Do Now?"
The Levellers – "Hope Street"
Supergrass – "Caught by the Fuzz"
Whale – "Hobo Humpin' Slobo Babe"
Ash – "Angel Interceptor"
Lush – "Single Girl"
Elastica – "Connection"
Garbage – "Queer"
The Stone Roses – "She Bangs the Drums"
New Order – "Blue Monday"
The Smiths – "How Soon Is Now?"
Gene – "Olympian"

Disc 2
Björk – "It's Oh So Quiet"
Dreadzone – "Little Britain"
Blur – "Country House"
The Wonder Stuff – "The Size of a Cow"
Menswear – "Stardust"
Oasis – "Cigarettes & Alcohol"
Happy Mondays – "Kinky Afro"
Primal Scream – "Movin' on Up"
Morrissey – "The More You Ignore Me, the Closer I Get"
The Verve – "History"
Suede – "Stay Together"
The Charlatans – "Just When You're Thinkin' Things Over"
The Jesus & Mary Chain – "Far Gone and Out"
Echobelly – "Great Things"
The Wannadies – "Might Be Stars"
Skunk Anansie – "Weak"
The Chemical Brothers – "Life is Sweet"
Fluke – "Tosh"
Massive Attack – "Protection"
McAlmont & Butler – "You Do"

"Blue Monday" has been shortened slightly from its original 12" version, while the following track "How Soon is Now?" has been extended slightly. Both songs come to approx. 6:40 in length.
There are 28 credited artists in the full title of the album.

Volume 3 (1996)
VTDCD 084

Disc 1
The Prodigy – "Firestarter"
Leftfield/Lydon – "Open Up"
Iggy Pop – "Lust for Life"
Supergrass – "Going Out"
Oasis – "Don't Look Back in Anger"
Cast – "Sandstorm"
Ocean Colour Scene – "You've Got It Bad"
Garbage – "Stupid Girl"
The Lightning Seeds – "Pure"
The Stone Roses – "What The World Is Waiting For"
Radiohead – "Street Spirit (Fade Out)"
Dubstar – "Stars"
Blur – "The Universal"
St. Etienne – "Only Love Can Break Your Heart"
New Order – "Temptation"
The Levellers – "This Garden"
The Charlatans – "Weirdo"
Ash – "Kung Fu"
Underworld – "Born Slippy"

Disc 2
Paul Weller – "The Changingman"
Oasis – "Round Are Way"
Happy Mondays – "Step On"
Sleeper – "Inbetweener"
Lush – "Ladykillers"
Terrorvision – "Perseverance"
Goldbug – "Whole Lotta Love"
Babylon Zoo – "Spaceman"
Menswear – "Sleeping In"
Marion – "Time"
Echobelly – "King of the Kerb"
Pulp – "My Legendary Girlfriend"
Elastica – "Stutter"
Skunk Anansie – "Selling Jesus"
The Chemical Brothers – "Chemical Beats" (Dave Clarke Remix)
60ft Dolls – "Stay"
Teenage Fanclub – "Sparky's Dream"
Gene – "For the Dead"
Dreadzone – "Life Love & Unity"
Massive Attack – "Sly"

The Prodigy are credited as simply 'Prodigy'. The Chemical Brothers are credited as simply 'Chemical Brothers'.
Although the Dave Clarke remix of "Chemical Beats" is featured, this is only mentioned in the booklet, and the back cover just simply lists "Chemical Beats" without mention of the remix.
There are 28 credited artists in the full title of the album.

Volume 4 (1996)
VTDCD 096

Disc 1
Oasis – "Some Might Say"
Cast – "Alright"
Ocean Colour Scene – "The Day We Caught the Train"
Manic Street Preachers – "A Design for Life"
Suede – "Trash"
Ash – "Goldfinger"
Sleeper – "Sale of the Century"
Dodgy – "In a Room"
Lightning Seeds – "Sense"
Space – "Female of the Species"
The Charlatans – "One to Another"
The Chemical Brothers – "Loops of Fury"
Underworld – "Born Slippy"
The Prodigy – "No Good (Start The Dance)"
Björk – "Army of Me"
Goldie – "Inner City Life"
Everything but the Girl – "Walking Wounded"
Stereo MC's – "Step It Up"
Dubstar – "Not So Manic Now"

Disc 2
Paul Weller – "Sunflower"
R.E.M. – "Orange Crush"
The Smiths – "Panic"
Blur – "Charmless Man"
Radiohead – "Just"
The Presidents of the United States of America – "Peaches"
Rocket from the Crypt – "On a Rope"
Skunk Anansie – "All I Want"
The Stone Roses – "Love Spreads"
Garbage – "Only Happy When It Rains"
Ash – "Oh Yeah"
Babybird – "You're Gorgeous"
Super Furry Animals – "If You Don't Want Me to Destroy You"
Longpigs – "Far"
Mansun – "Stripper Vicar"
Shed Seven – "Where Have You Been Tonight"
The Levellers – "Just the One"
Placebo – "Teenage Angst"
Massive Attack – "Safe from Harm"
Sneaker Pimps – "6 Underground"
Oasis – "The Masterplan"

The Chemical Brothers are credited as simply Chemical Brothers
There are 26 artists credited in the full title of the album.

Volume 5 (1997)

Pulp – "Sorted for Es and Wizz"
Kula Shaker – "Tattva"
Oasis – "Live Forever"
Manic Street Preachers – "Everything Must Go"
Blur – "Beetlebum"
Placebo – "Nancy Boy"
Apollo 440 – "Ain't Talkin' 'bout Dub"
The Prodigy – "Breathe"
Fun Lovin' Criminals – "Scooby Snacks"
Mansun – "Wide Open Space"
Depeche Mode – "Barrel of a Gun"
Garbage – "Milk"
Skunk Anansie – "Hedonism (Just Because You Feel Good)"
Suede – "Beautiful Ones"
The Supernaturals – "The Day Before Yesterday's Man"
Bennet – "Mum's Gone to Iceland"
Sleeper – "Nice Guy Eddie"
Shed Seven – "Getting Better"
The Presidents of the United States of America – "Lump"
Geneva – "Into the Blue"
Underworld – "Pearl's Girl"
Paul Weller – "Out of the Sinking"
Oasis – "Roll with It"
Ocean Colour Scene – "The Riverboat Song"
R.E.M. – "What's the Frequency Kenneth"
Deep Purple – "Hush"
Cast – "Flying"
Space – "Dark Clouds"
The Lightning Seeds – "Lucky You"
The La's – "There She Goes"
Dodgy – "Good Enough"
White Town – "Your Woman"
Babybird – "Candy Girl"
808 State and James Dean Bradfield – "Lopez"
The Aloof – "One Night Stand"
Radiohead – "Fake Plastic Trees"
Longpigs – "Lost Myself"
Terrorvision – "Easy"
The Stone Roses – "I Am the Resurrection"

There are 22 credited artists in the full title of the album.

Volume 6 (1997)

Radiohead – "Paranoid Android"
Blur – "Song 2"
Supergrass – "Richard III"
Foo Fighters – "This Is a Call"
eels – "Novocaine for the Soul"
The Charlatans – "North Country Boy"
Cast – "Free Me"
Manic Street Preachers – "Australia"
Kula Shaker – "Hey Dude"
Pulp – "Disco 2000"
Monaco – "What Do You Want from Me"
The Supernaturals – "Smile"
John Lydon – "Sun"
3 Colours Red – "Copper Girl"
Fun Lovin' Criminals –  "King of New York"
Sneaker Pimps – "6 Underground"
Depeche Mode – "Home"
Primal Scream – "Star"
Skunk Anansie – "Brazen (Weep)"
The Chemical Brothers – "Setting Sun"
Republica – "Ready to Go"
Reef – "Place Your Hands"
Bush – "Swallowed"
Teenage Fanclub – "Ain't That Enough"
The Stone Roses – "Made of Stone"
Suede – "Lazy"
Ether – "If You Really Want to Know"
Geneva – "Tranquilizer"
Mansun – "She Makes My Nose Bleed"
Embrace – "The Last Gas"
Ben Folds Five – "Battle of Who Could Care Less"
My Life Story – "Strumpet"
Hurricane#1 – "Just Another Illusion"
Placebo – "Bruise Pristine"
Kenickie – "Punka"
The Future Sound of London – "We Have Explosive"
Fluke – "Absurd"
Super Furry Animals – "Hermann Loves Pauline"
The Verve – "On Your Own"
Dodgy – "Staying Out for the Summer"

There are 25 credited artists in the title.
Having given Oasis two songs on every album in the series, this is the first volume not to feature any of the bands' music; it does however feature The Chemical Brothers' "Setting Sun" which is co-written by Noel Gallagher and features him on lead vocals. The following Volume 7 also featured no Oasis songs.

Volume 7 (1998)

Disc 1
The Verve – "Sonnet"
Embrace – "Come Back to What You Know"
Radiohead – "Karma Police"
Space – "Begin Again"
The Dandy Warhols – "Not If You Were the Last Junkie on Earth"
Fatboy Slim – "The Rockafeller Skank"
Iggy Pop – "The Passenger"
Primal Scream – "Rocks"
Brock Landars – "S.M.D.U."
Chumbawamba – "Tubthumping"
Robbie Williams – "Let Me Entertain You"
Supergrass – "Sun Hits the Sky"
The Charlatans – "How High"
Skunk Anansie – "Twisted (Everyday Hurts)"
The Stone Roses – "What The World Is Waiting For"
Blur – "On Your Own"
The Pixies – "Monkey Gone to Heaven"
Catherine Wheel – "Delicious"
Kenickie – "I Would Fix You"
Ether – "Best Friend"

Disc 2
Mansun – "Wide Open Space" (Pefecto remix)
PF Project feat. Ewan McGregor – "Choose Life"
Run-D.M.C. vs. Jason Nevins – "It's Like That"
Collapsed Lung – "Eat My Goal"
Garbage – "Push It"
The Levellers – "What a Beautiful Day"
Ocean Colour Scene – "Hundred Mile High City"
Fat Les – "Vindaloo"
The Prodigy – "Poison"
Whale – "Four Big Speakers"
Bentley Rhythm Ace – "Bentley's Gonna Sort You Out"
Lo Fidelity Allstars – "Vision Incision"
Air – "Kelly Watch the Stars"
Bran Van 3000 – "Drinking in LA"
Massive Attack – "Teardrop"
Unbelievable Truth – "Settle Down"
Cornershop – "Brimful of Asha"
Super Furry Animals – "Ice Hockey Hair"

Unusual for compilation albums, the "Brimful of Asha" featured on disc two is the original version, not the Norman Cook remix which reached #1 in the UK charts.
The band Air are credited as Air French Band.
There are 16 credited artists in the full title of the album.
This volume features repeats of songs featured in previous volumes from the series; The Stone Roses' "What The World Is Waiting For" featured on Volume 3, and Mansun's "Wide Open Space" featured on Volume 5, although the version of "Wide Open Space" here is a remix by Paul Oakenfold.

The Best Funk Album in the World...Ever!
This is a double tape or CD compilation of 1970s funk and blaxploitation soundtrack music. The album is a de facto follow up to the EMI/Virgin release Superfunk though it was decided to list the album under the stronger Best..Ever brand name.

The concept of the album is similar to the Harmless collections and to BMG Global TV's Blaxplotation album series.

The Best Christmas Album in the World... Ever!
This is a double CD album of various Christmas music, originally released in 1996. In 2000, a new edition was released, The Best Christmas Album in the World... Ever! (new edition).

1996 Edition

Disc One

"Happy Xmas (War Is Over)" – John Lennon & Yoko Ono
"Wonderful Christmastime" – Paul McCartney
"I Wish It Could Be Christmas Every Day" – Wizzard
"Merry Xmas Everybody" – Slade
"Do They Know It's Christmas?" – Band Aid
"Fairytale of New York" – The Pogues featuring Kirsty MacColl
"I Believe in Father Christmas" – Greg Lake
"2000 Miles" – Pretenders
"A Spaceman Came Travelling" – Chris De Burgh
"The Power of Love" – Frankie Goes to Hollywood
"Driving Home for Christmas" – Chris Rea
"Step into Christmas" – Elton John
"Merry Christmas Everyone" – Shakin' Stevens
"Another Rock and Roll Christmas" – Gary Glitter
"Little Saint Nick" – The Beach Boys
"Santa Claus Is Coming to Town" – Jackson 5
"In Dulce Jubilo" – Mike Oldfield
"Stop the Cavalry" – Jona Lewie
"Christmas Wrapping" – The Waitresses
"Ring Out, Solstice Bells" – Jethro Tull
"Peace on Earth/Little Drummer Boy" – David Bowie/Bing Crosby

Disc Two

"White Christmas" – Bing Crosby
"The Christmas Song" – Nat 'King' Cole
"Let It Snow, Let It Snow, Let It Snow" – Dean Martin
"Mary's Boy Child" – Harry Belafonte
"When a Child is Born" – Johnny Mathis
"Mistletoe and Wine" – Cliff Richard
"Walking in the Air" – Aled Jones
"I Believe" – Robson & Jerome
"Winter Wonderland" – Doris Day
"Lonely Pup (In a Christmas Shop)" – Adam Faith
"Rockin' Around the Christmas Tree" – Mel & Kim
"Last Christmas" – State of the Heart
"Happy Holiday" – Andy Williams
"Santa Baby" – Eartha Kitt
"Lonely This Christmas" – Mud
"Pretty Paper" – Roy Orbison
"Silver Bells" – Jim Reeves
"God Rest Ye Merry Gentlemen" – Perry Como
"We Wish You a Merry Christmas" – The Weavers
"The Twelve Days of Christmas" – The Spinners
"Gaudete" – Steeleye Span
"In the Bleak Midwinter" – Bert Jansch
"What Are You Doing New Year's Eve" – Mary Margaret O'Hara (Frank Loesser)

2000 New Edition

Disc One

"Happy Xmas (War Is Over)" – John Lennon & Yoko Ono
"Wonderful Christmastime" – Paul McCartney
"I Wish It Could Be Christmas Every Day" – Wizzard
"Merry Xmas Everybody" – Slade
"Do They Know It's Christmas?" – Band Aid
"I Believe in Father Christmas" – Greg Lake
"A Spaceman Came Travelling" – Chris De Burgh
"The Power of Love" – Frankie Goes to Hollywood
"Angels" – Robbie Williams
"Baby, It's Cold Outside" – Tom Jones with Cerys from Catatonia
"Saviour's Day" – Cliff Richard
"Step into Christmas" – Elton John
"Sleigh Ride" – Spice Girls
"Little Saint Nick" – The Beach Boys
"Santa Claus Is Coming to Town" – Jackson 5
"In Dulci Jubilo" – Mike Oldfield
"Stop the Cavalry" – Jona Lewie
"Christmas Wrapping" – The Waitresses
"Ring Out, Solstice Bells" – Jethro Tull
"The Millennium Prayer" – Cliff Richard

Disc Two
"White Christmas" – Bing Crosby
"The Christmas Song" – Nat 'King' Cole
"Let It Snow, Let It Snow, Let It Snow" – Dean Martin
"Mary's Boy Child" – Matt Monro
"Mistletoe and Wine" – Cliff Richard
"Walking in the Air" – Aled Jones
"Winter Wonderland" – Doris Day
"Lonely Pup (In a Christmas Shop)" – Adam Faith
"Rockin' Around the Christmas Tree" – Mel & Kim
"Last Christmas" – State of the Heart
"Little Town" – Cliff Richard
"Frosty the Snowman" – Nat 'King' Cole
"Rudolph the Red Nosed Reindeer" – Dean Martin
"Lonely This Christmas" – Mud
"God Rest Ye Merry Gentlemen" – Ella Fitzgerald
"Deck the Halls" – Treorchy, Morriston Orpheus & Pontarddulais Male Choirs with the Band of the Welsh Guards
"Have Yourself a Merry Little Christmas" – Jane McDonald
"We Wish You a Merry Christmas" – The Weavers
"The Twelve Days of Christmas" – The Spinners
"Gaudete" – Steeleye Span
"Silent Night, Holy Night" – Sinéad O'Connor
"In the Bleak Midwinter" – Bert Jansch
"Peace on Earth/Little Drummer Boy" – David Bowie/Bing Crosby
"What Are You Doing New Year's Eve" – Mary Margaret O'Hara (Frank Loesser)

The Best...Anthems...Ever!
A 2-CD compilation released in 1997.

Disc 1
"Tubthumping" – Chumbawamba
"Parklife" – Blur
"Love Is the Law" – The Seahorses
"North Country Boy" – The Charlatans
"The Day We Caught the Train" – Ocean Colour Scene
"Alright" – Supergrass
"Tattva" – Kula Shaker
"Place Your Hands" – Reef
"Creep" – Radiohead
"Swallowed" – Bush
"Scooby Snacks" – Fun Lovin' Criminals
"This Is a Call" – Foo Fighters
"Nancy Boy" – Placebo
"Breathe" – The Prodigy
"Girl From Mars" – Ash
"Weak" – Skunk Anansie
"You Love Us" – Manic Street Preachers
"Block Rockin' Beats" – The Chemical Brothers
"Born Slippy" – Underworld
"Open Up" – Leftfield/Lydon

Disc 2
"The Drugs Don't Work" – The Verve
"Street Spirit (Fade Out)" – Radiohead
"There She Goes" – The La's
"Stupid Girl" – Garbage
"Disco 2000" – Pulp
"Trash" – Suede
"Sit Down" – James
"Alright – Cast
"Life of Riley" – The Lightning Seeds
"The Changingman" – Paul Weller
"Novocaine for the Soul" – eels
"Peaches" – The Presidents of the United States of America
"Fools Gold" – The Stone Roses
"Hope Street" – The Levellers
"Yes" – McAlmont and Butler
"Wide Open Space" – Mansun
""Heroes"" – David Bowie
"Song 2" – Blur
"Caught by the Fuzz" – Supergrass
"Lust for Life" – Iggy Pop
"Choose Life" – PF Project Feat. Ewan McGregor

The Best Air Guitar Album in the World...Ever!
These were a series of albums compiled by Brian May from Queen that ran from 2001 to 2005.
Despite the first volume only entering at #5, it achieved at least Gold status, whilst the second volume received Platinum status.

Volume 1 (2001)
The first volume was released 5 November 2001, and entered the compilations charts at #5. It featured twenty tracks on CD1 and twenty one on CD2. It opens with an exclusive version of the Queen song "Tie Your Mother Down" subtitled "(Air Guitar Edit)", which features a different intro (a snippet of the song "We Will Rock You") than the original version (which was sometimes credited separately from the song). Also on the album was another Queen song, "Bohemian Rhapsody", the four-minute edit of the Lynyrd Skynyrd song "Freebird", and many other songs, including a rare appearance from The Jimi Hendrix Experience.

Volume 2 (2002)
After the success of volume 1, the second volume was released November 2002. Like volume 1, there was an exclusive on the album: Brian May's cover of "God Save the Queen" recorded on top of Buckingham Palace in 2002. Also featured was Queen's "One Vision" and many pop punk and nu metal songs which were fairly recent at the time of release. Brian May had help in compiling the album from several other musicians, alongside Ashley Abram (who normally compiles all The Best...Ever! series).

Volume 3 (2003)
Volume 3 was released November 2003. Intended to be "the last Air guitar album in the world... ever!" according to the liner notes, there was later a "best of the best" album. Volume 3 featured a rare recording of the Pink Floyd song "Have a Cigar" by the Foo Fighters with Brian May. Queen's "Now I'm Here" also featured. The liner notes feature small quotes about each song/artist by May. Volumes 1 & 2 also did this, but focused mainly on the guitarist, rather than the song.

US repackage of Volume 1 (2003)
In 2003, the success of Volume 1 meant the album was released in the US by Hollywood Records. It was given the new name World's Greatest Air Guitar Album. The album cover featured the same image, but was moved, alongside the new album text.

Volumes I & II (2003)
Following the success of Volume 2, Volumes 1 and 2 were compiled into a box set, released in the same original CD boxes, but a slipcase had been placed over them displaying new artwork. The cover subtitles the set 4 CD Deluxe Limited Edition.

Best of the Best (2005)
In 2005, the series returned with a 3-CD album titled The Best of the Best Air Guitar Albums in the World Ever. Due to the fact volume 3 claimed to be the last volume, The liner notes (written by Brian May) note "OK, we lied". Most of the songs had already appeared on volumes 1, 2 & 3, but there were some which didn't, such as The Darkness' "I Believe in a Thing Called Love" and an exclusive Queen + Paul Rodgers live performance of "Fat Bottomed Girls".

Other
The first two volumes were re-released in 2006.
The first volume was re-released in Portugal in 2002 with new artwork.
In 2004, a 1-disc edited version of the first volume was released to unknown ventures with different artwork.

The Best Scottish Album in the World...Ever!
This album was released 9 June 1997. It is notable for being perhaps the only widely available compilation album that features Wolfstone, who feature with their song "Battle", credited as "The Battle". At the end of the second disc is the Dunblane cover of the song "Knockin' on Heaven's Door". All royalties from the recording of this song were sent to charities. The previous compilation Hits 97 also sent royalties from the song to charity.

The Best Driving Anthems in the World...Ever!
This is a CD compilation of power ballads. Several editions have been released since the first album, Power Ballads – The Greatest Driving Anthems in the World... Ever!, was released in 2004.

The Best Club Anthems in the World ...Ever!
This is a sub-series in the series which ran from 1997 to 2006.

Here is a list of albums in the series:

 The Best Club Anthems ...Ever! (1997)
 The Best Club Anthems 2 ...Ever! (1997)
 The Best Club Anthems III ...Ever!  (1998)
 The Best Club Anthems 99 ...Ever! (1999)
 The Best Club Anthems 2000 (1999)
 The Best Club Anthems ...Ever! 2K (2000)
 The Best Club Anthems 2001 (2000)
 The Best Club Anthems 2002 (2002)
 The Best Club Anthems Summer 2002 (2002)
 The Best Club Anthems 2003 (2002)
 The Very Best Club Anthems ...Ever! (2003)
 The Best Club Anthems 2004 (2004)
 The Best Club Anthems 2005 (2005)
 The Best Club Anthems 05 (2005)
 The Best Club Anthems Classics (2005)
 The Best Club Anthems 2006 (2006)
 The Best Club Anthems 80s Anthems (2006)

Every album from the first volume to The Best Club Anthems 2003 was digitally mixed. Starting with The Very Best Club Anthems ...Ever!, The songs were unmixed.
The same album also started another tradition which was slightly different packaging. Previous volumes featured a border on the cover with small circles in each corner, although this new tradition was short, and the border re-appeared for the last three albums in the series, starting with The Best Club Anthems Classics.
The series was very successful. It offered a third alternative to the Now Dance series, with the other alternative being The Best Dance Album series.

See also
The Worst...Album in the World...Ever...EVER! (Album by Shirehorses)
Best Blur Album in the World Ever (Working title for the Blur album Blur: The Best of)
Now That's What I Call Music! (Another long-running series of compilations by Virgin Records, EMI and Ashley Abram)

Compilation album series
Christmas compilation albums
1990s compilation albums